The Dixie League was a Class D level baseball league that played in the 1916 and 1917 seasons, with teams based in the US states of Alabama and Georgia.

History
The Dixie League played a full season in 1916, with the Dolthan team winning the championship with a 38–22 record in the six–team league. In its second season, the league folded on July 4, 1917 with the Moultrie Packers in 1st place.

Sixteen years later, the  Dixie League was reformed, with teams based in the western Gulf Coast states. It played in the 1933 season before splitting into two Class C level leagues, the East Dixie League and West Dixie League in 1934.

Cities Represented 
 Bainbridge, GA: Bainbridge 1916–1917 
 Dothan, AL: Dolthan 1916–1917 
 Eufaula, AL: Eufaula 1916–1917 
 Moultrie, GA: Moultrie Packers 1916–1917 
 Quitman, GA: Quitman 1916–1917 
 Tifton, GA: Tifton Tilters 1917 
 Valdosta, GA: Valdosta Millionaires 1916

Standings & statistics

1916 Dixie League
schedule
No Playoff Scheduled.

1917 Dixie League
schedule
The league disbanded July 4.

References

1916 establishments in Alabama
1916 establishments in Georgia (U.S. state)
1917 disestablishments in the United States
Defunct minor baseball leagues in the United States
Baseball leagues in Alabama
Baseball leagues in Georgia (U.S. state)
Sports leagues established in 1916
Sports leagues disestablished in 1917